The Rest is a compilation album released by the Scottish band Deacon Blue in October 2012. It is part of the band's catalogue reissue program.

The Rest, as the title implies, contains tracks that were not necessarily associated with the studio albums, such as the Four Bacharach & David Songs EP and the Walking Back Home compilation. It also includes the new tracks featured on the band's 1994 and 2006 greatest hits compilations.

The Rest is also the title of a song from the band's most recent studio album, The Hipsters.

Track listing

References

Deacon Blue albums
2012 compilation albums